Sophie Rocks is a small group of land rocks midway between Spigot Peak and Zeiss Needle, overlooking Selvick Cove to the west and Orne Harbour to the east, Arctowski Peninsula, Danco Coast, Antarctica. The name Sophie Rocks was originally used by Frederick Cook, a member of the Belgian Antarctic Expedition, in 1898 to refer to this conspicuous group of rocks and presumably Spigot Peak and Zeiss Needle, as well.

References

Rock formations of Graham Land
Danco Coast